Hail Caesar is a 1994 American comedy film directed by Anthony Michael Hall (his directorial debut) and starring Hall, Robert Downey Jr., Samuel L. Jackson, Judd Nelson, and Bobbie Phillips.

Premise
Caesar is having a hard time dividing his time between his band and his rich girlfriend, Buffer, whose father hates him. Buffer's father calls Caesar in to make a bet: If Caesar makes $100,000 within six months, he can have Buffer; if he does not, he is banished from her life.

Cast
 Anthony Michael Hall as Julius Caesar McMurty
 Bobbie Phillips as Buffer Bidwell
 Leslie Danon as Annie
 Nicholas Pryor as Bidwell
 Robert Downey Jr. as Jerry
 Judd Nelson as Prisoner One
 Michael J. Clouse as Sound Engineer
 Robert Downey Sr. as The Butler
 Frank Gorshin as Pete Dewitt
 Samuel L. Jackson as The Mailman
 Kane Picoy as Remora

Crew
 Michael Mandaville – Unit Production Manager
 Don Dunn – Production Supervisor
 Reba Gielch – Location Manager
 Adam Kane – Camera Operator
 Tony Smyles – Sound Mixer
 Jonathan Woods – Storyboard Artist
 David Bouzan – Computer Graphics Design

Home media
Lions Gate Home Entertainment released the film on DVD in 2004.

References

External links
 
 
 

1994 films
1994 comedy films
American comedy films
American rock music films
Heavy metal films
1994 directorial debut films
Films set in Los Angeles
American independent films
1990s English-language films
1990s American films